Mango Hill railway station is one of the stations (the other being Mango Hill East railway station) located on the Redcliffe Peninsula railway line that serves the suburb of Mango Hill in Moreton Bay Region, Queensland, Australia. It opened on 4 October 2016.

Services
Mango Hill is served by trains operating from Kippa-Ring to Roma Street and Springfield Central. Some afternoon weekday services continue to Ipswich.

Services by platform

Transport links
Hornibrook Bus Lines operate three routes via Mango Hill station:
681: Mango Hill to North Lakes
682: Mango Hill to North Lakes
687: to North Lakes

References

External links

Railway stations in Moreton Bay Region
Railway stations in Australia opened in 2016
Mango Hill, Queensland